Daniel James Walton (July 14, 1947 – August 9, 2017) was an American Major League Baseball outfielder. Walton attended Bishop Amat Memorial High School, and was selected in the 10th round (192nd overall) of the 1965 MLB draft by the Houston Astros. He played for the Houston Astros (1968 and 1977), Seattle Pilots / Milwaukee Brewers (1969–71), New York Yankees (1971), Minnesota Twins (1973 and 1975), Los Angeles Dodgers (1976), Yokohama Taiyo Whales (1978), and Texas Rangers (1980). During a nine-year major league baseball career, he hit .223, with 28 home runs, and 107 runs batted in (RBI) in 297 career games.

Walton, along with Sandy Valdespino, was traded from the Houston Astros to the Seattle Pilots for Tommy Davis on August 31, 1969. Popular with the Brewers fans who sat in the left field bleachers at Milwaukee County Stadium, Walton was dealt to the Yankees for Bobby Mitchell and Frank Tepedino on June 7, 1971. Walton was sent by the Yankees to the Minnesota Twins for Rick Dempsey on October 31, 1972.

Walton died August 9, 2017, in Morgan, Utah, aged 70.

References

External links

1947 births
2017 deaths
Baseball players from Los Angeles
Major League Baseball left fielders
Minnesota Twins players
Houston Astros players
Seattle Pilots players
Milwaukee Brewers players
Texas Rangers players
New York Yankees players
Los Angeles Dodgers players
Florida Rookie League Astros players
Cocoa Astros players
Salisbury Astros players
Amarillo Sonics players
Asheville Tourists players
Dallas–Fort Worth Spurs players
Florida Instructional League Royals players
Oklahoma City 89ers players
Syracuse Chiefs players
Tacoma Twins players
Albuquerque Dukes players
Spokane Indians players
Charleston Charlies players
American expatriate baseball players in Japan
Yokohama Taiyō Whales players